Kwang-su, also spelled Kwang-soo or Gwang-su, is a Korean masculine given name.  Its meaning differs based on the hanja used to write each syllable of the name.

Hanja
There are 13 hanja with the reading "kwang" and 67 hanja with the reading "su" on the South Korean government's official list of hanja which may be registered for use in given names. Ways of writing this name in hanja include:

.
. These same characters are also one possible way of writing the Japanese surname and given name Mitsumori.
. These same characters are also one possible way of writing the Japanese given name Mitsuhide.

According to South Korean government data, Kwang-su was the ninth-most popular name for newborn boys in 1945.

People
People with this name include:

Film and music
Park Kwang-su (born 1955), South Korean film director
Kim Jho Kwang-soo (born 1965), also known as Peter Kim, South Korean film director
Lee Kwang-soo (born 1985), South Korean actor

Sportspeople
Kim Kwang-soo (volleyball), South Korean volleyball player, represented South Korea at the 1964 Summer Olympics
Jeong Gwang-su (born 1968), South Korean rower
Oh Kwang-soo (born 1965), South Korean boxer
Back Kwang-soo (born 1978), South Korean rugby union footballer
Cha Kwang-su (born 1979), North Korean Greco-Roman wrestler

Writers
Shin Gwang-su (poet) (1712–1775), late Joseon Dynasty poet
Yi Kwang-su (1892–1950), Korean writer and independence activist
Ma Kwang-soo (1951–2017) South Korean educator and novelist

Other
Sin Gwang-su (spy) (born 1929), North Korean operative involved in abductions of Japanese citizens
Kim Kwang-soo (born 1954), South Korean biologist
Kwang Soo Kim (born 1960), South Korean chemist

See also
List of Korean given names

References

Korean masculine given names